Jasmin Kähärä (born May 4, 2000) is a Finnish cross-country skier. She participated in the women's sprint in the 2022 Winter Olympics, where she placed 26th. In 2023, she won the under-23 world championship in the classical sprint in Whistler, Canada.

Kähärä has been a member of the Finnish national team since the 2022-23 season, and was also regularly included in the World Cup roster in the previous season while still a member of the national B-team. Her best World Cup result is a 10th place from the Dresden city sprint in the 2021-22 season.

Kähärä's sister Jessica is a track and field athlete and her brother Jesse is a junior cross-country skier.

Cross-country skiing results
All results are sourced from the International Ski Federation (FIS).

Olympic Games

World Championships

World Cup

Season standings

References 

2000 births
Living people
Finnish female cross-country skiers
People from Mikkeli
21st-century Finnish women